Linda Dorcena Forry (born 1973) is a former Democratic member of the Massachusetts Senate, who represented the 1st Suffolk district from June 2013 - January 2018. She previously represented the 12th Suffolk District in the Massachusetts House of Representatives after winning a special election in April 2005. Haitian-American, Dorcena Forry, is the former House Chair of the Joint Committee on Community Development and Small Business.

Early life
Dorcena Forry was born and raised in the Dorchester neighborhood of Boston. She attended St. Kevin Grammar School and Monsignor Ryan Memorial High School in Dorchester before matriculating to Boston College. She graduated from BC's Carroll School of Management in 1997. Dorcena Forry received a master's degree in Public Administration from Harvard University's Kennedy School of Government in 2014.

Career

After graduating from Boston College, Dorcena Forry was a legislative assistant, working for then-State Representative Charlotte Golar Richie (Fifth Suffolk District serving Roxbury and Dorchester). When she left the State House in 1999 to work for the executive staff at the City of Boston's Department of Neighborhood Development, she had risen to the position of Acting Chief of Staff.

From 2005 to 2013, Dorcena Forry represented the Commonwealth's 12th Suffolk House district, a cross-section that includes parts of the town of Milton and the city of Boston, including Dorchester, Hyde Park and Mattapan. In 2009, Forry served as Chair of the Black and Latino Caucus. That same year, she was appointed Chairman of the Joint Committee on Community Development and Small Businesses.

Dorcena Forry won the Democratic nomination in the April 2013 special primary election to succeed state Senator Jack Hart in the First Suffolk Senate district, defeating Rep. Nick Collins. She defeated Republican Joseph A. Ureneck in the final election on May 28 and was sworn in on June 14, 2013. She stepped down on January 25, 2018, to become a vice president at Suffolk Construction.

Personal
Dorcena Forry is married to Bill Forry, managing editor of the Reporter Newspapers in Boston. The couple live in Lower Mills, Dorchester and have four children: John, Conor, Madeline and Norah. Three of her children were born during her tenure in the House of Representatives.

Awards
 2011 MPAH Haiti Movie Awards Humanitarian Award Recipient

References

External links 
Massachusetts General Court - State Senator Linda Dorcena Forry - official MA Senate website
Linda Dorcena Forry for State Senate campaign web site
Project Vote Smart - Representative Linda Dorcena Forry (MA) profile
Follow the Money - Linda Dorcena Forry
2006 campaign contributions
Constituent Website - Representative Linda Dorcena Forry (MA)

1973 births
Living people
American politicians of Haitian descent
Carroll School of Management alumni
Democratic Party members of the Massachusetts House of Representatives
Suffolk University alumni
Women state legislators in Massachusetts
Harvard Kennedy School alumni
21st-century American politicians
21st-century American women politicians